Pakal (also Romanized as Pākal; also known as Bākal) is a village in Astaneh Rural District, in the Central District of Shazand County, Markazi Province, Iran. At the 2006 census, its population was 721, in 224 families.

References 

Populated places in Shazand County